Ruislip Town Football Club was a football club based in Ruislip, England.

History
Ruislip Town first entered the FA Cup in 1948, losing 4–2 against Stevenage Town in the extra preliminary round. From 1952 to 1954, the club competed in the Parthenon League. In 1956, Ruislip Town joined the Hellenic League, becoming founder members of the newly formed Division One. In 1961, Ruislip Town left the Hellenic League, rejoining in 1977. In 1980, the club once against left the Hellenic League. In 1981, Ruislip Town merged with Coteford, to form Ruislip.

Ground
Ruislip Town played at Breakspear Road in Ruislip. The ground was later occupied by the newly formed Ruislip.

Records
Best FA Cup performance: Extra preliminary round, 1948–49, 1949–50

References

Sport in the London Borough of Hillingdon
Parthenon League
Hellenic Football League
Defunct football clubs in London
1981 disestablishments in England
Association football clubs disestablished in 1981